"The Bonny" is a song by Scottish singer-songwriter and acoustic guitarist Gerry Cinnamon. It was released as a single on 29 November 2019 by Little Runaway Records as the fourth single from his second studio album The Bonny. The song was written by Gerry Cinnamon, who also co-produced the song with Chris Marshall.

Charts

Release history

Cover versions

The Bonny was covered by American punk band Dropkick Murphys in 2022. It featured as a bonus track on the expanded edition of their 2021 album, Turn Up That Dial.

References

2019 songs
2019 singles
Gerry Cinnamon songs